Night Mayor (originally Dutch: Nachtburgemeester) is a municipal title used for someone who represents and helps develop a city's nightlife. The earliest known use of the title was in Rotterdam, Netherlands.

History 
In 2003 music collective De Nachtwacht (Dutch for "The Night Watch") was elected by an audience at the Paradiso music venue in Amsterdam to become a group of multiple so-called night mayors for an initial term of three years. Following elections at Melkweg on 1 March 2012, the position was held by Mirik Milan. In 2014, Milan co-founded (other co-founders: Michiel Friedhoff and Ella Overkleeft) the non-profit Stichting N8BM A’DAM (NGO Night Mayor Foundation) to institutionalise the title, coordinating between the city mayor, city council, and local businesses. Milan announced his departure in 2016, starting the search for a replacement which would be found in 2018.

Since 2016, the non-profit has organised annual "Night Mayor Summit" events to bring together leaders from around the world.

Around the world

Europe 
 Amsterdam, Netherlands: informal collective since 2003, institutionalised since 2014, the first in the world.
 London, United Kingdom: since 2016, with Amy Lamé as the first Night Czar. Mirik Milan was invited in 2015 by the London government for advice on the position.
 Mannheim, Germany: since 2018, the first in Germany. 
 Prague, Czech Republic: since 2019.
Manchester, United Kingdom: Sacha Lord is the Night Time Economy Adviser for Greater Manchester, appointed by Mayor Andy Burnham in 2018.

Latin America 
 Cali, Colombia: since 2016, the first in Latin America.

North America 
 Washington DC, USA: since 2018.

References 

Nightlife
Positions of authority
Titles
2003 introductions
2003 establishments in the Netherlands
Dutch inventions